Dutch Tamils or Holland Tamils are people of ethnic Tamil ancestry who reside in Netherlands. Around 20,000 Tamils mostly from Sri Lanka are estimated to be living in Netherlands. The relationship between Tamils and Dutch dates back to the colonial era. The Dutch East India Company was active in Sri Lanka and Southern India. In Sri Lanka, most of Tamil areas were under Dutch Ceylon rule between 1640–1796. During Dutch rule some Dutch loanwords were adopted in Sri Lankan Tamil language. Back then, Tamils and Malayalis were known as "Malabars" among the Portuguese and Dutch.

The earliest Tamil immigrants to Netherlands came in the 1980s, and were primarily educated personnel, businessmen and students. When the Sri Lankan civil war broke out, many Tamils migrated 1984 onward were asylum seekers. Between 1984 and 1987, more than 3,500 Tamil men arrived in Netherlands. A Second wave of Tamil refugees came between 1990 and 1992, which included women and children. Since 1995, the population of Sri Lankans in Netherlands has doubled, in 1996 there were 5,600 and in 2010 there were 10,346 people.

There is a low unemployment rate among Dutch Tamils, because they have shown willingness to accept jobs, that is below their qualifications. They attach great importance to education and also pay attention to their children's education.  Dutch Tamils live mostly in small towns like Zeist, Utrecht, Nieuwegein, Roermond, Den Bosch, Breda, Den Helder and Hoorn, because the former refugees were settled away from big cities like Amsterdam.

Most of Tamils living in Netherlands are Hindus and there are many Tamil Hindu temples (Kovils) in Netherlands like Vinayagar Temple in Den Helder or Murugan Temple in Roermond. There are Tamil Christian minorities, who belong to Catholic and Evangalist churches.

References

Netherlands
Netherlands
Dutch Tamils
Dutch Tamils